The 2023 Waterford Senior Hurling Championship was the 123rd staging of the Waterford Senior Hurling Championship since its establishment by the Waterford County Board in 1897. The draw for the group stage placing took place on 7 February 2023. The championship is scheduled to run from July to September 2023.

Ballygunner will enter the championship as the defending champions in search of a record-breaking 10th successive title.

Group A

Group A table

Group B

Group B table

Group C

Group C table

Group D

Group D table

Knockout stage

Preliminary quarter-finals

Quarter-finals

Semi-finals

Final

References

Waterford Senior Hurling Championship
Waterford
Waterford Senior Hurling Championship